Jurdab (Arabic: جرداب) is a village located in the Kingdom of Bahrain. 
It neighbors the villages of Jid Ali and Sanad and the 9th area in Isa Town, to the south of the capital Manama.

Etymology
The name Jurdab is believed to have originated from the Persian word گرداب (Ger-dab) meaning whirlpool.

History
In J. G. Lorimer's Gazetteer of the Persian Gulf (1908), he writes that Jurdab consisted of 30 reed huts inhabited by the Baharna, whom were date palm cultivators. There were an estimated 2,230 date palms in the village.

References

Populated places in Bahrain